Chief Moses Adekoyejo Majekodunmi C.F.R, C.M.G. (17 August 1916 – 11 April 2012) was a Nigerian gynaecologist and obstetrician. He was also Minister of Health in the Nigerian First Republic.

As an Oloye of the Yoruba people, he held the chieftaincy titles of the Mayegun of Lagos and the Otun Balogun of the Christians of Egbaland.

Early life and education
Moses was born in Abeokuta in August 1916. He studied at Abeokuta Grammar School, St. Gregory's College, Lagos, before proceeding to Trinity College Dublin where he earned a degree in Anatomy and Physiology in 1936. He also earned a 1st Class degree in Bacteriology  and Clinical Medicine in 1940.

Medical career
In Ireland, he worked as in-house physician at the National Children's Hospital and the Rotunda Hospital from 1941 to 1942. In 1943, he joined the Federal Government Medical Services as a medical doctor and established his medical practice. He played key roles in the establishment of the Lagos University Teaching Hospital and also founded Saint Nicholas Hospital in Lagos, which opened in March 1968.

Political career
He was elected into the Nigerian Senate in 1960. He was appointed sole administrator of Western Region in June 1962 after a political crisis in the region, holding office in place of the Premier Samuel Akintola until December that year.

The crisis was due to a struggle between Akintola and the former Western Region Premier and current leader of the opposition Obafemi Awolowo, which had led to violent scenes in the House of Assembly.
On advice from the police, one of his first acts was to sign restriction orders to detain leaders of both factions.
After the situation had stabilized, Akintola resumed office on 1 January 1963.

See also
Olufemi Majekodunmi

Bibliography

References

Health ministers of Nigeria
1916 births
2012 deaths
Yoruba royalty
Nigerian royalty
Politicians from Abeokuta
Yoruba physicians
Yoruba politicians
Nigerian gynaecologists
University of Lagos people
Nigerian Christians
20th-century Nigerian politicians
20th-century Nigerian medical doctors
St Gregory's College, Lagos alumni
Alumni of Trinity College Dublin
Physicians from Lagos
Nigerian obstetricians